Symmocoides oxybiella is a moth of the family Autostichidae. It is found in France, Italy, Spain and Portugal.

References

External links
Images representing Symmocoides oxybiella at Consortium for the Barcode of Life

Moths described in 1872
Symmocoides
Moths of Europe